Pnina Granirer (born April 11, 1935 in Brăila, Romania) is a Romanian-born Canadian painter and writer.

Life
In 1944, as a child, Granirer witnessed the transport ready to take her and other Romanian Jews to the extermination camps. Her life was saved when the Second Jassy–Kishinev Offensive saw the Red Army drove out Nazi German forces. After World War II, Granirer's family were "sold" to Israel by the Romanian government. She emigrated to Israel, where she attended the Bezalel Academy of Arts and Design. After completing her degree, she moved to Vancouver, British Columbia in 1965.

Career
Her works have been exhibited and collected nationally and internationally. Granirer founded the Artists in Our Midst, the first art walk in Vancouver, in 1993. Her book, Light within the Shadows; A Painter's Memoir, was published in May 2017.

Selected exhibitions

Solo

Group

References

External links
 
 Author question and answer: Pnina Granirer talks Light Within the Shadows
 Artists in Our Midst

Living people
1935 births
Canadian women painters
Romanian women artists
People from Brăila
Canadian people of Romanian-Jewish descent
Romanian emigrants to Israel
Jewish Canadian artists
Jewish women painters
Jewish painters
Canadian memoirists
21st-century Canadian non-fiction writers
21st-century Canadian women artists
21st-century Canadian painters
21st-century Canadian women writers
Jewish Canadian writers
21st-century memoirists
Canadian women memoirists